Silvano Varettoni (born 3 December 1984) is a former Italian World Cup alpine ski racer.

World Cup results
Top 10

References

External links
 

1984 births
Living people
Italian male alpine skiers
Sportspeople from the Province of Belluno